Gary 'The Hoover' Sanderson is a former professional rugby league footballer who played in the 1980s and 1990s.

Playing career

Premiership Final appearances
Gary Sanderson played in Warrington's 38-10 victory over Halifax in 1985–86 Rugby League Premiership during the 1985–86 season at Elland Road, Leeds on Sunday 18 May 1986.

Challenge Cup Final appearances
Gary Sanderson played right- in Warrington's 14-36 defeat by Wigan in the 1990 Challenge Cup Final during the 1989–90 season at Wembley Stadium, London on Saturday 28 April 1990, in front of a crowd of 77,729.

County Cup Final appearances
Gary Sanderson played left- in Warrington's 16-28 defeat by Wigan in the 1987 Lancashire Cup Final during the 1987–88 season at Knowsley Road, St. Helens on Sunday 11 October 1987, in front of a crowd of 20,237, played right- (replaced by interchange/substitute Ronnie Duane on 65-minutes) in the 24-16 victory over Oldham in the 1989 Lancashire Cup Final during the 1989–90 season at Knowsley Road, St. Helens on Saturday 14 October 1989, in front of a crowd of 9,990.

John Player Special/Regal Trophy Final appearances
Gary Sanderson played left- in Warrington's 4-18 defeat by Wigan in the 1986–87 John Player Special Trophy Final during the 1986–87 season at Burnden Park, Bolton on Saturday 10 January 1987, in front of a crowd of 22,144, and played as an interchange/substitute, i.e. number 15 (replacing Paul Darbyshire on 18-minutes) in the 10-40 defeat by Wigan in the 1994–95 Regal Trophy Final during the 1994–95 season at Alfred McAlpine Stadium, Huddersfield on Saturday 28 January 1995, in front of a crowd of 19,636.

References

External links
Statistics at wolvesplayers.thisiswarrington.co.uk

1967 births
Living people
English rugby league players
Rugby league players from St Helens, Merseyside
Rugby league second-rows
Warrington Wolves players